Gemini (Latin for "twins") is the third astrological sign in the zodiac. Under the tropical zodiac, the sun transits this sign between about May 21 to June 21. Gemini is represented by the twins, Castor and Pollux, known as the Dioscuri in Greek mythology. It is a positive, mutable sign.

Mythology 
In Babylonian astronomy, the stars Pollux and Castor were known as the Great Twins. Their names were Lugal-irra and Meslamta-ea, meaning "The Mighty King" and "The One who has arisen from the Underworld". Both names are titles of Nergal, a major Babylonian god of plague and pestilence, who was king of the underworld.

In Greek mythology, Gemini is associated with the myth of Castor and Pollux. Pollux was the son of Zeus, who seduced Leda, while Castor was the son of Tyndareus, the king of Sparta and Leda's husband. When Castor died, because he was a mortal, Pollux begged his father Zeus to give Castor immortality, which was done through uniting them together in the heavens.

In popular culture
NASA named its two-person space capsule Project Gemini after the zodiac sign because the spacecraft could carry two astronauts.

Gallery

See also

Astronomical symbols
Chinese zodiac
Circle of stars
Cusp (astrology)
Elements of the zodiac

Notes

References
 Longitude of Sun, apparent geocentric ecliptic of date, interpolated to find time of crossing 0°, 30°....

External links

Warburg Institute Iconographic Database (over 300 medieval and early modern images of Gemini) 

Western astrological signs
Divine twins